Bill McLeod Jacobsen (born 30 November 1974 in Klaksvík, Faroe Islands) is head coach along with Heðin Askham for the Faroe Islands national under-21 football team. He was first appointed in 2007. These years have been a major success for the Faroe Islands under-21 team, especially 2009-2010 when the team finished the qualification with an historical 11 points, which is the highest by any Faroese national team has ever got during qualification stages.

Career in the Faroese FA 
In 1998, Jacobsen was appointed as assistant coach for the Faroe Islands national under-16 team. This was the start of his career with Faroe Islands FA (Fótbóltssamband Føroya) where he was head coach for the Faroe Islands national under-14, under-17, and under-19, before he and Heðin Askham got the job as head coaches for Faroe Islands under-21 team.

Jacobsen has also been Assistant Manager for the Faroe Islands national football team for one match. For personal reasons the assistant manager of the Faroe Islands national team couldn’t be there for the away game against Switzerland in 2001. So Bill McLeod Jacobsen was asked to replace him for that match and worked with former European Footballer of the Year (1977) Allan Simonsen, who was the head coach for Faroe Islands national team.

Club career 
Jacobsen also has a long career on the club level. 2008-2011 he was the manager for B68 Toftir and in 2009 he won the title as Manager of the Year on the Faroe Islands. Before being B68’s manager, Bill McLeod Jacobsen was assistant manager for NSÍ Runavík (2002) working with manager Jógvan Martin Olsen, former Faroese National team coach, and assistant manager for KÍ Klaksvík (2000) where he worked with manager Tomislav Sivic, who's a former manager for Serbia’s national under-21 football team and under-19 team.

On youth level Jacobsen also has experience with both Faroese and Danish teams. From 1987 to 1994, Jacobsen wasthe head coach for several of KÍ Klaksvík’s youth teams and from 1995 to 1998 he was youth team coach in Esbjerg fB in Denmark.

Jacobsen is a UEFA A License registered coachsincem 2006. Despite his young age Jacobsen has 13 years of experience working for the Faroese FA and several years of experience on club level in the Faroe Islands as well as in Denmark. Therefore, Jacobsen is considered to be one of the most experienced and talented managers from the Faroe Islands.

References 

1974 births
Living people
Faroese football managers
People from Klaksvík